Qaleh Bahadri (also Romanized as Qal‘eh Bahādrī; also known as Qal‘eh Badrī) is a village in Dasht-e Zahab Rural District, in the Central District of Sarpol-e Zahab County, Kermanshah Province, Iran. At the 2006 census, its population was 215, in 40 families.

References 

Populated places in Sarpol-e Zahab County